The Harbour is a mental health hospital in Blackpool, Lancashire, England. It is managed by Lancashire Care NHS Foundation Trust. The hospital provides in-patient mental health services for Lancashire.

History
The hospital was officially opened by Alastair Campbell in October 2015. Since opening it has had difficulties attracting sufficient skilled psychiatric staff.

References

External links

Psychiatric hospitals in England
Blackpool